Benahavís is a Spanish town (pueblo) and municipality in  the province of Malaga. It is mountain village between Marbella, Estepona, and Ronda, 7 kilometers from the coast.

On the southern face of La Serranía de Ronda mountain range, Benahavís is one of the most mountainous villages on the western Costa del Sol, near the resort beaches as well as the spectacular mountains of the Serrania de Ronda. Its terrain is traversed by the Guadalmina, Guadaiza and Guadalmansa Rivers. Places of great natural and historic interest are to be found within its boundaries, such as El Cerro del Duque, Daidin and the Montemayor Castle.

During the late 1990s, the Junta de Andalucia constructed a dam on the site of an old marble quarry, and now for much of the year the once ever-flowing Río Guadalmina is a dried-up riverbed.

History

At the end of the 11th century, Benahavís was founded by Arabs. The village was intimately involved with Andalusia's Arabic past, and particularly with Marbella, the municipal district to which it belonged until it was granted the so-called "Carta Puebla" by Philip II in 1572. Montemayor Castle, built prior to the founding of Benahavís, played an important role in disputes between successive Arab rulers in Andalusia, because of its strategic position. It was disputed for many years by the various military factions of the time. Its prominent location overlooking the coast, with up to a hundred kilometres of seaboard visible in clear weather,  and even the African coast, was extremely useful at a time when piracy and invasion were commonplace. The town takes its name from Havis, an 11th-century Moorish prince who reigned in Montemayor Castle. The name Benahavís is derived from the Arabic "Bin al Havis", meaning "son of Havis".

The castle's strategic location drew the attention of the Catholic Monarchs, who were intent on conquering the last Moorish kingdoms in the south of the Iberian Peninsula. Isabel and Ferdinand's forces had already laid siege to the Nazarite kingdom of Granada, but they decided first to occupy the nearby province of Málaga. Soon after, on the 11th of June, 1485, Benahavís, together with the localities of Daidin, Montemayor Castle, Cortes Fortress, Ojen, Arboto, Almáchar, Tramores and Calalui Fort (the Castle of Light), in the Sierra Bermeja, all within the district of Marbella, were handed over to King Ferdinand the Catholic, by Mohammed Abuneza after the signing of the capitulation.

The Catholic Monarchs entrusted their custody to Don Pedro Villandrado, Count of Ribadeo, the first Christian mayor of Benahavís. From that moment on, a dispute arose between Benahavís and Marbella which lasted three and a half centuries, until Benahavís achieved the status of an independent community.

References

External links

 http://www.benahavis.net

Municipalities in the Province of Málaga